The Sulawesi bear cuscus, also known as the Sulawesi bear phalanger (Ailurops ursinus), is a species of arboreal marsupial in the family Phalangeridae that is endemic to Sulawesi and nearby islands in Indonesia. A. ursinus is threatened by hunting, collection for the pet trade and deforestation.

When approached, their automatic reaction is to wrap their tail around a nearby branch and switch from tripedal and bipedal posture with their foreleg raised. While doing these movements, they're constantly making short, harsh sounds.

Bear cuscuses can feed on the young leaves of up to 31 different species of plants varying from trees, lianas, and mistletoes. Feeding only amounts to about 5% of their daily activity, compared to about 63% spent on resting.

Gallery

References

Possums
Mammals of Sulawesi
Mammals described in 1824
Taxonomy articles created by Polbot